Pachyrukhos is an extinct genus of hegetotheriid notoungulate from the Early to Middle Miocene (Colhuehuapian-Friasian in the SALMA classification) of Argentina and Chile. Fossils of this genus have been found in the Collón Curá, Sarmiento and Santa Cruz Formations of Argentina and the Río Frías Formation of Chile.

Description 
Pachyrukhos was probably also able to hop, and it had a rabbit-like skull with teeth adapted for eating nuts and tough plants. The complexity of its hearing apparatus in the skull suggests that its hearing would have been very good, and that it probably had large ears. It also had large eyes, suggesting that it may have been nocturnal. These similarities are the result of convergent evolution, since, while quite unrelated to modern rabbits, Pachyrukhos filled the same ecological niche.

References 

Typotheres
Miocene mammals of South America
Friasian
Santacrucian
Colhuehuapian
Neogene Argentina
Fossils of Argentina
Neogene Chile
Fossils of Chile
Fossil taxa described in 1885
Taxa named by Florentino Ameghino
Prehistoric placental genera
Austral or Magallanes Basin
Golfo San Jorge Basin
Santa Cruz Formation
Sarmiento Formation